Harpreet Brar (born 16 September 1995) is an Indian cricketer. He plays for Punjab in Domestic Cricket and for Punjab Kings in the Indian Premier League (IPL). Harpreet once hit five sixes in an over in one of his club matches. He considers Yuvraj Singh as his idol.

Early life
Harpreet Brar was born in Meerut, where his father, a soldier and police officer, was stationed. He then moved to the small village of Hariewala , Moga and, when he was 5, to Zirkapur. Brar started playing for the Ropar district team in 2011 and eventually represented Punjab at the under-16 level.

Career
On 18 December 2018, Harpreet got an IPL contract, in the 2019 IPL Auction. He was bought by the Kings XI Punjab ahead of the 2019 Indian Premier League.

After playing in IPL 2019, Harpreet found his place in the international side. On 20 August 2019, he was named in the India Under-23 squad for a five-match one-day series against Bangladesh Under-23, held at the Ekana Cricket Stadium in Lucknow in September 2019. He made his debut in the second match of the series.

On 30 April 2021, against Royal Challengers Bangalore, Brar took his maiden IPL wicket, of Virat Kohli, and finished the match with the figures of 3–19 in his four overs. He also took the wicket of Glenn Maxwell, which he took back to back alongside Kohli's, and the wicket of AB de Villiers.

In February 2022, he was bought by the Punjab Kings in the auction for the 2022 Indian Premier League tournament.

References

External links
 

1995 births
Living people
Indian cricketers
Punjab Kings cricketers
Punjab, India cricketers